R. Clark Jones (June 30, 1916April 26, 2004) was an American physicist working in the field of optics. He studied at Harvard University and received his PhD in 1941. Until 1944 he worked at Bell Labs, later until 1982 with the Polaroid Corporation. In a sequence of publications between 1941 and 1956 he demonstrated a mathematical model to describe the polarization of coherent light, the Jones calculus.

When William Shurcliff wrote Polarized Light: Production and Use he praised R. C. Jones in the preface: "The author’s debt to Dr. R. Clark Jones, the inventor of the Jones calculus, is immeasurable. The sections dealing with the Stokes vector, the Mueller calculus, and the Jones calculus could not have been written without long and painstaking coaching by him."

Publications

See also
 Sinusoidal plane-wave solutions of the electromagnetic wave equation Polarization of classical electromagnetic waves
 Polarization (waves)

References

Further reading
 

20th-century American physicists
Harvard University alumni
Optical physicists
1916 births
2004 deaths
SPIE